Kevin Hambly (born March 12, 1973) is an American volleyball coach. He previously coached at the University of Illinois at Urbana–Champaign (2009–2017). Coaching his first team to a 26-6 record, he had reached at least the Sweet Sixteen or better in each of his team's appearances at the NCAA Tournament. On 30 January 2017, he accepted a job as head coach of the Stanford volleyball team, replacing John Dunning after he retired.

Personal life
Hambly was born in Simi Valley, California, and received his Bachelor of Science degree in Recreation, Sport, and Tourism with an emphasis in sports management in 2006. He is married to Mary Coleman Hambly, who is both a former player (1995–98) and former assistant coach (2004–06) at Illinois. Kevin and Mary have two children, Joseph and Maura Hambly.

Playing career
Hambly played high school volleyball at Royal High School in Simi Valley, California, where he was named an All-American his senior year.  He also played basketball at Royal High School and was named all-league.

He continued his career at Brigham Young University from 1992 to 1995, where he started from 1993 to 1995. Hambly was named Third-Team All-American during his junior season and First-Team All-American during his senior season. Hambly holds the BYU school record for solo blocks in a game, which he set with five against Ball State his freshman year.

Following his time at BYU, Hambly played professional volleyball with Montpellier Université Club in Montpellier, France, during the 1995-96 season.

Coaching career
Hambly started coaching at the Highline Volleyball Club in Northridge, California, where he served as the head coach of the 16 and under teams from 1995 to 1997.

Following his time with the Highline Volleyball Club, Hambly joined the UNLV coaching staff as an assistant coach. During his time at UNLV, he also founded the Rebel volleyball club in Las Vegas as well as the men's club volleyball team at UNLV.

In 2001, Hambly left UNLV to become the assistant USA national volleyball team, where he also served as the head coach of the USA Women's National Training Team.

Illinois
In 2004, Hambly came to the University of Illinois as an assistant coach under Don Hardin.  After five years as an assistant coach, Hambly was named the head coach in January 2009. As both an assistant and head coach, Hambly has proven himself to be one of the premier recruiters in college volleyball, securing the sixth-ranked recruiting class in 2007 and the seventh-ranked class in 2010.  His first season as head coach saw Illinois place second in the Big Ten Conference and reach the third round of the NCAA Division I Volleyball Tournament.

In his second year as head coach of the Fighting Illini, he guided the team to the sweet sixteen yet again, despite some major injuries suffered by key players during the season.  Following the season, Hambly continued his tradition of successful recruiting by securing the third-ranked recruiting class in the nation.

In the 2011 season, his third year as head coach, Hambly's Fighting Illini swept the season series with four-time defending national champions Penn State.  Both Volleyball Magazine (VBM) and AVCA polls ranked his team at #1 for four weeks.  Later, during the semifinals of the NCAA Tournament, he coached his squad to victory in one of the most memorable matches in school history with an upset over #1 ranked USC.  After guiding his Illinois team to an NCAA Tournament runners-up spot with two outstanding players, Michelle Bartsch a VBM first-team All-American and Colleen Ward a VBM second-team All-American, Hambly was named VBM 2011 National Coach of the Year.

Stanford
Hambly accepted the position of head coach of volleyball for Stanford on 30 January 2017, leaving his previous position as head coach at the University of Illinois. In 2018 Hambly led Stanford to its eighth, and his first, NCAA national championship.

Head coaching record

Honors 
2011 National Coach of the Year by Volleyball Magazine

References 

1973 births
American volleyball coaches
Living people
BYU Cougars men's volleyball players
Illinois Fighting Illini women's volleyball coaches
Stanford Cardinal women's volleyball coaches
UNLV Rebels women's volleyball coaches
People from Granada Hills, Los Angeles